Marc Bouet (born 7 May 1951 in Nantes) is a sailor from France, who represented his country at the 1992 Summer Olympics in Barcelona, Spain as helmsman in the Soling. With crew members Fabrice Levet and Alain Pointet they took the 15th place. Marc with crew members Gildas Morvan and Sylvain Chtounder took 11th place during the 1996 Summer Olympics in Savannah, United States as helmsman in the Soling.

References

External links 
 
 
 
 

1951 births
Living people
Sailors at the 1992 Summer Olympics – Soling
Sailors at the 1996 Summer Olympics – Soling
Olympic sailors of France
Sportspeople from Nantes
European Champions Soling
Soling class world champions
French male sailors (sport)
Mediterranean Games gold medalists for France
20th-century French people